Ramchandra Veerappa (1908–2004) was an Indian politician who represented Bidar constituency in the Lok Sabha from 1962 to 1971 and from 1991 to 2004. He was a member of the Karnataka Legislative Council from 1948 to 1952.

In 1947, he was elected to the Municipal Council, Bidar. He was elected from Bidar to Lok Sabha in 1962 and 1967 as member of Congress. He joined Congress (O) when the party split in 1969, and lost from Bidar in 1971 and 1977. Later he joined BJP and was elected to Lok Sabha from Bidar five times, the last in 2004 at the age of 95. While campaigning in 2004, he said he hoped to contest five years later at the age of 100. He never went to school but learned to read and write in his native Kannada. He was also fluent at Deccani Urdu, Hindi, and Marathi. He said he rarely spoke in Lok Sabha because he was not much familiar with English.

He was a dalit. He married thrice. His first wife died childless. He separated from his second wife decades after they had married, and picked up a third wife in his 60s. In all, he had nine children.

He died on 18 Jul 2004 at Hyderabad Hospital due to kidney dysfunction at the age of 96.

References

2004 deaths
Bharatiya Janata Party politicians from Karnataka
India MPs 2004–2009
India MPs 1999–2004
India MPs 1998–1999
India MPs 1996–1997
India MPs 1991–1996
India MPs 1967–1970
India MPs 1962–1967
People from Bidar
1908 births
Members of the Karnataka Legislative Council
People from Bidar district
Lok Sabha members from Karnataka
Mysore MLAs 1957–1962
Members of the Mysore Legislature